Bare & Rare is the second studio album by South Korean singer Chungha. The first part was released on July 11, 2022, under MNH Entertainment and 88rising.

Background
On June 27, 2022, Chungha revealed a detailed teaser schedule for the first part of her second studio album, titled Bare & Rare. The mood sampler in "Bare" version was uploaded on June 28. It showcased a "dreamy" and "mechanical" sound with a "strange" tension. On June 30, the official photo of "Bare #1" was released, showing Chungha in silhouette along with vintage colours and natural styling, while the "Bare #2" was released on July 1. The teaser images for the lead single "Sparkling" were released on July 2, which were said to have an "enchanting" atmosphere. The second image depicts the singer in a red dress surrounded by flowers. The track list for the album was released on July 4, with the highlight medley being released two days later on July 6. The music video teaser was released on July 8 and 9 respectively. Countdown posters were released on July 9 and 10 respectively before the official D-day countdown poster and album was released on July 11, 2022.

Composition
The album consists of 8 tracks, all of which were co-produced and co-written by Chungha. The album includes: "XXXX", "Sparkling", "Louder" "California Dream", "Good Night My Princess", "Love Me Out Loud", "Nuh-Uh" and "Crazy Like You" featuring 88rising labelmate Bibi. The album marks Chungha's first full comeback after her first full-length album "Querencia" which was released in 2021.

"Louder" is a catchy pop track with bouncy beats and twinkling effects. Chungha aims to encourage listeners to stop apologising for the space they take up and start owning their strength.

The lead single "Sparkling" was considered a change to Chungha's previous music style.

Conception
At a press conference in Seoul, Chungha shared her feelings about the album and reflected on her previous works, citing that she "felt empty for some reason".

Release and promotion
Prior to the release of the album, Chungha performed "California Dream" on June 25, 2022, at the Seoul Waterbomb Festival 2022.

Critical reception

Tanu I. Raj of NME gave 3 out of 5 stars while stating that "the K-pop soloist’s second studio album stumbles occasionally but displays her complexity and commendable desire to grow".

Track listing

Charts

Weekly charts

Monthly charts

Release history

References

2022 albums
Korean-language albums
Chungha albums
88rising albums
Genie Music albums
Stone Music Entertainment albums